Jorge Oscar Rosa is a Puerto Rican professional football manager.

Career
In 1992, he coached the Puerto Rico national football team.

References

Year of birth missing (living people)
Living people
Puerto Rican football managers
Puerto Rico national football team managers
Place of birth missing (living people)